Csaba Dömötör (born in Budapest on 13 September 1982) is a Hungarian international relations expert and politician. He is a member of National Assembly of Hungary (Országgyűlés) since 2018. He has served as the Secretary of State in the Prime Minister's office.

References 

Living people
1982 births
People from Budapest
Hungarian politicians
21st-century Hungarian politicians
Fidesz politicians
Members of the National Assembly of Hungary (2018–2022)